Burmese cuisine encompasses the diverse regional culinary traditions of Myanmar, which have developed through longstanding agricultural practices, centuries of sociopolitical and economic change, and cross-cultural contact and trade with neighboring countries at the confluence of South Asia, Southeast Asia, and East Asia, including the modern-day nations of India, China, and Thailand.

Burmese cuisine is typified by a wide-ranging array of dishes, including traditional Burmese curries, Burmese salads, and soups that are traditionally eaten with white rice. Burmese cuisine also features noodles in many forms, as fried or dry noodles, noodle soups, or as noodle salads, as well as Indian breads. Street food culture has also nurtured the profuse variety of traditional Burmese fritters and traditional snacks called mont.

The contrasting flavor profile of Burmese cuisine is broadly captured in the phrase chin ngan sat, which literally means "sour, salty, and spicy." A popular Burmese rhyme — "of all the fruit, the mango's the best; of all the meat, the pork's the best; and of all the leaves, lahpet's the best" — sums up the traditional favourites.

History

Rice is the principal staple in Burmese cuisine, reflecting several millennia of rice cultivation, which first emerged in the country's Chindwin, Ayeyarwady, and Thanlwin river valleys between 11,000 and 5000 BCE. By 3000 BCE, irrigated rice cultivation flourished, paralleled by the domestication of cattle and pigs by inhabitants. In addition to rice, tea originated in the borderlands separating Myanmar from China, precipitating a longstanding tradition of tea consumption and the development of pickled tea known as laphet, which continues to play a pivotal role in Burmese ritual culture. This longstanding history is reflected in the Burmese language, which is among the few world languages whose word for "tea" is not etymologically traced back to the Chinese word for "tea" (see etymology of tea). 

Agrarian settlements were settled by ancestors of Myanmar's modern-day ethnolinguistic groups. From these settlements emerged a succession of Burmese, Mon, Shan, Rakhine-speaking kingdoms and tributary states that now make up contemporary Myanmar. Paddy rice cultivation remains synonymous with the predominantly Buddhist Bamar, Mon, Shan, and Rakhine peoples who inhabit the country's fertile lowlands and plateaus.

Burmese cuisine has been significantly enriched by contact and trade with neighboring kingdoms and countries well into modern times. The Columbian exchange in the 15th and 16th centuries introduced key ingredients into the Burmese culinary repertoire, including tomatoes, chili peppers, peanuts, and potatoes. A series of Burmese–Siamese wars between the 16th to 19th centuries resulted in the emergence of Thai-inspired delicacies, including khanon dok, shwe yin aye, mont let hsaung, and Yodaya mont di.  

While record-keeping of pre-colonial culinary traditions is scant, food was and remains deeply intertwined with religious life, especially among Buddhist communities, exemplified in the giving of food alms (dāna), and communal feasts called satuditha and ahlu pwe (အလှူပွဲ). One of the few remaining pre-colonial cookbooks is the Sadawhset Kyan, written on a palm leaf manuscript in 1866 during the Konbaung dynasty. By the Konbaung dynasty (16th to 19th centuries), elaborate preparations of food played a central role in key court ceremonies (e.g., naming ceremonies, wedding ceremonies, etc.), including as ritual offerings to Hindu and indigenous deities, and as celebratory meals for attendees.

British rule in Burma between the 19th and 20th centuries led to the establishment of Burmese Indian and Sino-Burmese communities that introduced novel cooking techniques, ingredients, food vocabulary, and fusion dishes that are now considered integral parts of Burmese cuisine. These range from Indian breads such as naan and paratha to Chinese stir frying techniques and ingredients like tofu and soy sauce.

Etiquette and customs

Dining 

Traditionally, the Burmese eat meals from plates on a low table or daunglan, while sitting on a bamboo mat. Dishes are simultaneously served and shared. A traditional meal includes steamed white rice as the main dish accompanied by Burmese curries, a light soup or consommé, and other side dishes, including fried vegetables, Burmese fritters, and ngapi yay gyo (ငါးပိရည်ကျို), a plate of fresh and blanched vegetables served with pickled fish dip. The meal is then finished with a piece of palm sugar or laphet (fermented tea leaves).

Out of respect, the eldest diners are always served first before the rest join in; even when the elders are absent, the first morsel of rice from the pot is scooped and put aside as an act of respect to one's parents, a custom known as u cha.

The Burmese traditionally eat with their right hand, forming the rice into a small ball with only the fingertips and mixing this with various morsels before popping it into their mouths. Chopsticks and Chinese-style spoons are used for noodle dishes, although noodle salads are more likely to be eaten with just a spoon. Western-style utensils, especially forks and knives, have gained currency in recent years.

Religious practices 
The country's diverse religious makeup influences its cuisine, as Buddhists and Hindus traditionally avoid beef and Muslims pork. Beef is considered taboo by devout Buddhists and farmers because the cow is highly regarded as a beast of burden. Vegetarianism is commonly practiced by Buddhists during the three-month Vassa (ဝါတွင်း) between July and October, as well as during Uposatha days, reflected in the Burmese word for "vegetarian," thet that lut (သက်သတ်လွတ်). During this time, devout Buddhists observe eight or more precepts, including fasting rules that restrict food intake to two daily meals (i.e., breakfast and lunch) taken before noon.

Beef taboo 
The beef taboo is fairly widespread in Myanmar, particularly in the Buddhist community. In Myanmar, beef is typically obtained from cattle that are slaughtered at the end of their working lives (16 years of age) or from sick animals. Cattle is rarely raised for meat; 58% of cattle in the country is used for draught animal power. Few people eat beef, and there is a general dislike of beef (especially among the Bamar and Burmese Chinese), although it is more commonly eaten in regional cuisines, particularly those of ethnic minorities like the Kachin. Buddhists, when giving up meat during the Buddhist (Vassa) or Uposatha days, will forego beef first. Butchers tend to be Muslim because of the Buddhist doctrine of ahimsa (no harm).

During the country's last dynasty, the Konbaung dynasty, habitual consumption of beef was punishable by public flogging. In 1885, Ledi Sayadaw, a prominent Buddhist monk wrote the Nwa-myitta-sa, a poetic prose letter which argued that Burmese Buddhists should not kill cattle and eat beef, because Burmese farmers depended on them as beasts of burden to maintain their livelihoods, that the marketing of beef for human consumption threatened the extinction of buffalo and cattle, and that the practice was ecologically unsound. He subsequently led successful beef boycotts during the colonial era, and influenced a generation of Burmese nationalists in adopting this stance.

On 29 August 1961, the Burmese Parliament passed the State Religion Promotion Act of 1961, which explicitly banned the slaughtering of cattle nationwide (beef became known as todo tha). Religious groups, such as Muslims, were required to apply for exemption licences to slaughter cattle on religious holidays. This ban was repealed a year later, after Ne Win led a coup d'état and declared martial law in the country.

Food theories
In traditional Burmese medicine, foods are divided into two classes: heating (apu za) or cooling (a-aye za), based on their effects on one's body system, similar to the Chinese classification of food. Examples of heating foods include chicken, bitter melon, durian, mango, chocolate, and ice cream. Examples of cooling foods include pork, eggplant, dairy products, cucumbers, and radish.

The Burmese also hold several taboos and superstitions regarding consumption during various occasions in one's life, especially pregnancy. For instance, pregnant women are not supposed to eat chili, due to the belief that it causes children to have sparse scalp hairs.

Cooking techniques

Burmese dishes are not cooked with precise recipes. The use and portion of ingredients used may vary, but the precision of timing is of utmost importance. Burmese dishes may be stewed, boiled, fried, roasted, steamed, baked or grilled, or any combination of the said techniques. Burmese curries use only a handful of spices (in comparison to Indian ones) and use more fresh garlic and ginger.

Regional and variant cuisines 

Broadly speaking, Burmese cuisine is divided between the culinary traditions of Upper Myanmar, which is inland and landlocked; and Lower Myanmar; which is surrounded by numerous rivers, river deltas, and the Andaman Sea. Variations between regional cuisines are largely driven by the availability of fresh ingredients. Myanmar's long coastline has provided an abundant source of fresh seafood, which is particularly associated with Rakhine cuisine. Southern Myanmar, particularly the area around Mawlamyaing, is known for its cuisine, as the Burmese proverb goes: "Mandalay for eloquence, Yangon for boasting, Mawlamyaing for food."

Cuisine in Lower Myanmar, including Yangon and Mawlamyaing, makes extensive use of fish and seafood-based products like fish sauce and ngapi (fermented seafood). The cuisine in Upper Myanmar, including the Bamar heartland (Mandalay, Magway, and Sagaing Regions), Shan State, and Kachin States, tends to use more meat, poultry, pulses and beans. The level of spices and use of fresh herbs varies depending on the region; Kachin and Shan curries will often use more fresh herbs.

Fusion Chettiar cuisine, originating from Southern Indian cuisine, is also popular in cities.

Dishes and ingredients

Because a standardised system of romanisation for spoken Burmese does not exist, pronunciations of the following dishes in modern standard Burmese approximated using IPA are provided (see IPA/Burmese for details).

Preserved foods

Myanmar is one of very few countries where tea is not only drunk but eaten as lahpet, pickled tea served with various accompaniments. The practice of eating tea dates in modern-day Myanmar back to prehistoric antiquity, reflecting the legacy of indigenous tribes who pickled and fermented tea leaves inside bamboo tubes, bamboo baskets, plantain leaves and pots. Tea leaves are traditionally cultivated by the Palaung people. Pickled tea leaves continue to play an important role in Burmese culture today.

Ngapi, a fermented paste made from salted fish or shrimp, is considered the cornerstone of any Burmese traditional meal. It is used to season many soups, salads, curries and dishes, and condiments, imparting a rich umami flavor. The ngapi of Rakhine State contains no or little salt, and uses marine fish. Meanwhile, ngapi made with freshwater fish is common in Ayeyarwady and Tanintharyi regions. Ngapi yay is an essential part of Karen and Bamar cuisine, in which a sauce dip of ngapi cooked in various vegetables and spices is served with blanched and fresh vegetables, similar to Thai nam phrik, Indonesian lalab, and Malay ulam.

Shan cuisine traditionally uses fermented beans called pè ngapi, in lieu of ngapi, to impart umami. Dried bean ngapi chips are used as condiments for various Shan dishes.

Pon ye gyi, a thick salty black paste made from fermented beans, is popular in the Bamar heartland. It is used in cooking, especially with pork, and as a salad with peanut oil, chopped onions and red chili. Bagan is an important pon ye gyi producer.

Burmese cuisine also features a wide variety of pickled vegetables and fruits that are preserved in oil and spices, or in brine and rice wine. The former, called thanat (သနပ်), are similar to South Asian pickles, including mango pickle. The latter are called chinbat (ချဉ်ဖတ်), and include pickles like mohnyin gyin.

Rice 

The most common staple in Myanmar is steamed rice, called htamin. Fragrant, aromatic varieties of white rice, including paw hsan hmwe, are popular. Lower-amylose varieties of glutinous rice, which are called kauk hnyin, also feature in Burmese cuisine, including a purple variety called ngacheik (ငချိပ်). Lower-amylose varieties of rice are commonly used in traditional Burmese snacks called mont. While rice is traditionally eaten plain, flavored versions like buttered rice and coconut rice are commonplace festive staples.

 Htamin gyaw – fried rice with boiled peas, sometimes with meat, sausage, and eggs.
 San byok – rice congee with fish, chicken or duck often fed to invalids.
 Danbauk (from Persian dum pukht) – Burmese-style biryani with either chicken or mutton served with mango pickle, a fresh salad of sliced onions, julienned cabbage, sliced cucumbers, fermented limes and lemons, fried dried chilies, and soup
Htamin jin (‌ ) – a rice, tomato and potato or fish salad kneaded into round balls dressed and garnished with crisp fried onion in oil, tamarind sauce, coriander and spring onions often with garlic, Chinese chive roots, fried whole dried chili, grilled dried fermented bean cakes and fried dried tofu on the side
Thingyan rice – fully boiled rice in candle-smelt water served with pickled marian plums

Noodles 

Burmese cuisine uses a wide variety of noodles, which are prepared in soups, salads, or other dry noodle dishes and typically eaten outside of lunch, or as a snack. Fresh, thin rice noodles called mont bat or mont di, are similar to Thai khanom chin, and feature in Myanmar's national dish, mohinga. Burmese cuisine also has a category of rice noodles of varying sizes and shapes called nan, including nangyi, thick udon-like noodles; nanlat, medium-sized rice noodles; nanthe, thinner rice noodles; and nanbya, flat rice noodles. Cellophane noodles, called kyazan and wheat-based noodles called khauk swe, are often used in salads, soups, and stir-fries.

Dry or fried noodle dishes include:

 Kat kyi kaik – a southern coastal dish (from the Dawei area) of flat rice noodles with a variety of seafood, land meats, raw bean sprouts, beans and fried eggs, comparable to pad thai
Meeshay – rice noodles with pork or chicken, bean sprouts, rice flour gel, rice flour fritters, dressed with soy sauce, salted soybean, rice vinegar, fried peanut oil, chilli oil, and garnished with crisp fried onions, crushed garlic, coriander, and pickled white radish/mustard greens
Mont di – an extremely popular and economical fast food dish where rice vermicelli are either eaten with some condiments and soup prepared from ngapi, or as a salad with powdered fish and some condiments.
 Panthay khao swè – halal egg noodles with a spiced chicken curry. The dish is associated with Panthay community, a group of Burmese Chinese Muslims.
 Sigyet khauk swè – wheat noodles with duck or pork, fried garlic oil, soy sauce and chopped spring onions. The dish originated from with the Sino-Burmese community

Noodle soups include:

Mohinga – the unofficial national dish, made with fresh thin rice noodles in a fish broth with onions, garlic, ginger, lemon grass and tender banana stem cores, served with boiled eggs, fried fishcake and Burmese fritters
Ohn-no khauk swè – curried chicken and wheat noodles in a coconut milk broth. It is comparable to Malaysian laksa and Northern Thai khao soi
Kyay oh – rice noodles in a broth of pork offal and egg, traditionally served in copper pot
 Kawyei khao swè – noodles and duck (or pork) curried with five-spice powder in broth with eggs, comparable to Singaporean/Malaysian lor mee
Mi swan – thin wheat noodles, known as misua in Singapore and Malaysia. It is a popular option for invalids, usually with chicken broth.
 Shan khauk swé – rice noodles with chicken or minced pork, onions, garlic, tomatoes, chili, crushed roasted peanuts, young snowpea vine, served with tofu fritters, and pickled mustard greens

Salads 

Burmese salads (transliterated athoke or athouk) are a diverse category of indigenous salads in Burmese cuisine. Burmese salads are made of cooked and raw ingredients that are mixed by hand to combine and balance a wide-ranging array of flavors and textures. Burmese salads are eaten as standalone snacks, as side dishes paired with Burmese curries, and as entrees.
 Lahpet thoke – a salad of pickled tea leaves with fried peas, peanuts and garlic, toasted sesame, fresh garlic, tomato, green chili, crushed dried shrimps, preserved ginger and dressed with peanut oil, fish sauce and lime
Gyin thoke (‌ ) – a salad of pickled ginger with sesame seeds
 Khauk swè thoke – wheat noodle salad with dried shrimps, shredded cabbage and carrots, dressed with fried peanut oil, fish sauce and lime
Let thoke son – similar to htamin thoke with shredded green papaya, shredded carrot, ogonori sea moss and often wheat noodles
Nan gyi thoke or Mandalay mont di, thick rice noodle salad with chickpea flour, chicken, fish cake, onions, coriander, spring onions, crushed dried chilli, dressed with fried crispy onion oil, fish sauce and lime
Samusa thoke – samosa salad with onions, cabbage, fresh mint, potato curry, masala, chili powder, salt and lime
 Kya zan thoke – glass vermicelli salad with boiled prawn julienne and mashed curried duck eggs and potatoes.

Curries 

Burmese curry refers to a diverse array of dishes in Burmese cuisine that consist of protein or vegetables simmered or stewed in an base of aromatics. Burmese curries generally differ from other Southeast Asian curries (e.g., Thai curry) in that Burmese curries make use of dried spices, in addition to fresh herbs and aromatics, and are often milder. The most common variety of curry is called sibyan, which is typified by a layer of oil that separates from the gravy and meat after cooked. Pork, chicken, goat, shrimp, and fish are commonly prepared in Burmese curries.

 Pork sibyan – classic Burmese curry with fatty cuts of pork
 Chicken sibyan – the classic Burmese curry, served with a thick gravy of aromatics
 Bachelor's chicken curry – a red and watery chicken curry cooked with calabash
 Goat hnat – a braised goat curry spiced with masala, cinnamon sticks, bay leaf, and cloves
 Nga thalaut paung – a curry of hilsa fish and tomatoes, which is slowly simmered to melt the fish bones
 Egg curry – a sour curry made with hardboiled duck or chicken eggs, cooked in tamarind paste and mashed tomatoes

Soups 

In Burmese cuisine, soups typically accompany meals featuring both rice and noodles, and are paired accordingly to balance contrasting flavors. Lightly flavored soups, called  are served with saltier dishes, while sour soups, called , are paired with rich, fatty Burmese curries. 

Thizon chinyay, cooked with drumstick, lady's finger, eggplant, green beans, potato, onions, ginger, dried chilli, boiled eggs, dried salted fish, fish paste and tamarind, is an elevated version of chinyay hin, and served during festive occasions.

Other grains and breads 

Indian breads are commonly eaten for breakfast or teatime in Myanmar. Palata, also known as htattaya (ထပ်တစ်ရာ), a flaky fried flatbread related to Indian paratha, is often eaten with curried meats or as dessert with sprinkled sugar, while nanbya, a baked flatbread, is eaten with any Indian dishes. Other favorites include aloo poori, chapati (ချပါတီ), and appam (အာပုံ).

Other dishes include:

 Burmese tofu – a tofu of Shan origin made from chickpea flour, eaten as fritters, in a salad, or in porridge forms
A sein kyaw – cabbage, cauliflower, carrot, green beans, baby corn, corn flour or tapioca starch, tomatoes, squid sauce
Ngapi daung – a spicy Rakhine-style condiment made from pounded ngapi and green chili
Nga baung htoke – a Mon-style steamed parcel of mixed vegetables and prawns, wrapped in morinda and banana leaves
Wet tha chin – Shan-style preserved minced pork in rice

Snacks 

Burmese cuisine has a wide variety of traditional snacks called mont, ranging from sweet desserts to savory food items that are steamed, baked, fried, deep-fried, or boiled. Traditional Burmese fritters, consisting of vegetables or seafood that have been battered and deep-fried, are also eaten as snacks or as toppings.

Savory snacks include:

 Hpet htok – meat, pastry paper, ginger, garlic, pepper powder, and salt. Usually served with soup or noodles.
 Samusa – Burmese-style samosa with mutton and onions served with fresh mint, green chilli, onions and lime
 Burmese pork offal skewers – pork offal cooked in light soy sauce, and eaten with raw ginger and chili sauce.
Htamane – dessert made from glutinous rice, shredded coconuts and peanuts

Sweet snacks include:

Mont let hsaung – tapioca or rice noodles, glutinous rice, grated coconut and toasted sesame with jaggery syrup in coconut milk
 Sanwin makin – semolina cake with raisins, walnuts and poppy seeds
 Shwe yin aye – agar jelly, tapioca and sago in coconut milk
Pathein halawa – a sticky sweetmeat made of glutinous rice, butter, coconut milk, inspired by Indian halwa
 Hpaluda – rose water, milk, coconut jelly, coconut shavings, sometimes served with egg custard and ice cream, similar to Indian falooda
Ngapyaw baung – A Mon-style dessert of bananas stewed in milk and coconut, and garnished with black sesame
 Saw hlaing mont – a Rakhine-style baked sweet, made from millet, raisins, coconut and butter

Fruits and fruit preserves
 
Myanmar has a wide range of fruits, mostly of tropical origin. Fruit is commonly eaten as a snack or dessert. While most fruits are eaten fresh, a few, including jengkol, are boiled, roasted or otherwise cooked. Popular fruits include banana, mango, watermelon, papaya, jujube, avocado, pomelo, and guava. Others include marian plum, mangosteen, sugar-apple, rambutan, durian, jackfruit, lychee, and pomegranate. Burmese fruit preserves, called yo, are also commonly eaten as standalone snacks. Common ones include fruit preserves made from fig, jujube, marian plum, citrus, mango, pineapple, and durian.

300 cultivars of mango are grown in Myanmar, the most popular being seintalon. 13 species of banana are locally cultivated in Myanmar, including the following cultivars:

 red - locally called shweni
 Dwarf Cavendish - locally called htawbat
 Mysore - locally called Rakhine
 Latundan - locally called htawbat

Beverages 

Tea is the national drink of Myanmar, reflecting the influence of Buddhism and its views on temperance. Tea is central to Burmese dining culture; complimentary green tea is customarily served to diners at restaurants and teashops alike. Various liquid concoctions made from fruits and coconut milk, including sugarcane juice, and mont let hsaung are also popular. Indigenous fermented drinks like palm wine are also found across the country. During a traditional Burmese meal, drinks are not often served; instead, the usual liquid refreshment is a light broth or consommé served from a communal bowl.

Burmese tea 

Plain green tea, yay nway gyan, is a popular form of tea drunk in Myanmar. Tea leaves are traditionally cultivated in Shan State and Kachin State. Milk tea, called laphet yay cho (လက်ဖက်ရည်ချို), made with strongly brewed black tea leaves, and sweetened with a customized ratio of condensed milk and evaporated milk, is also popular.

Alcohol 

Palm wine, called htan yay, made from the fermented sap of the toddy palm, is traditionally consumed in rural parts of Upper Myanmar Ethnic communities, including the Kachin and Shan, also brew local moonshines. Several ethnic minorities traditionally brew alcoholic beverages using rice or glutinous rice called . The khaung of the Chin peoples is brewed using millet seeds. Locally brewed beers include Irrawaddy, Mandalay, Myanmar, and Tiger.

Food establishments

Restaurants 
Dine-in restaurants that serve steamed rice with traditional Burmese curries and dishes are called htamin saing.

Tea shops 
During British rule in Burma, Burmese Indians introduced tea shops to the country, first known as kaka hsaing, which later evolved into teashops called laphet yay hsaing or kaphi (ကဖီး), the latter word from French café. Burmese tea shop culture emerged from a combination of British, Indian, and Chinese influences throughout the colonial period. Teashops are prevalent across the country, forming an important part of communal life. Typically open throughout the day, some Burmese tea shops cater to locals, long distance drivers and travellers alike. The Burmese typically gather in tea shops to drink milk tea served with an extensive array of snacks and meals.

Street food 
Street food stalls and hawkers are a feature of the Burmese urban landscape, especially in major cities like Yangon. Burmese salads, snacks, and fritters are especially popular street foods. In recent years, some major cities have clamped down on street food vendors. In 2016, Yangon banned the city's 6,000 street vendors from selling food on major thoroughfares, and relocated them to formal night markets set up by the city.

Night markets, called nya zay, are a feature of many Burmese towns and cities. Colonial observers as early as 1878 noted Burmese street hawkers selling delicacies such as fruits, cakes, and laphet during "night bazaars." The streets surrounding major daytime markets, such as Zegyo Market in Mandalay, typically double as makeshift night markets during the evenings.

See also 

 Myanmar
 Culture of Myanmar
 Rice production in Myanmar

Notes

References

Further reading
 Myanmar Business Today; Print Edition, 27 February 2014. A Roadmap to Building Myanmar into the Food Basket of Asia, by David DuByne & Hishamuddin Koh

External links

 Photo guide to eating in Myanmar
 Guide to eating vegetarian in Myanmar
 Mi Mi Khaing, Cook and Entertain the Burmese Way. Rangoon, 1975

 
Cuisine
Burma